The Procurator General of the USSR was the highest functionary of the Office of the Public Procurator of the USSR, responsible for the whole system of offices of public procurators and supervision of their activities on the territory of the Soviet Union.

History
The office of procurator had its historical roots in Imperial Russia, and under Soviet law public procurators had wide ranging responsibilities including, but not limited to, those of public prosecutors found in other legal systems. Offices of Public Procurators were and are still used in other countries adhering to the doctrine of socialist law.

The Office of Public Procurator of the USSR was created in 1936, and its head was called Public Procurator of the USSR until 1946, when it was changed to Procurator General of the USSR. According to the 1936 Soviet Constitution, the Procurator General exercised the highest degree of direct or indirect (through subordinate public procurators) control over the accurate execution of laws by all ministries, departments, their subordinate establishments and enterprises, executive and administrative bodies of local Soviets, cooperative organizations, officials (including judges in court proceedings), and citizens on behalf of the state.

The Procurator General was appointed by the Supreme Soviet of the USSR for a 7-year term and given a class rank of the Active state counselor of justice. His deputies and Procurator General of the Armed Forces were appointed by the Presidium of the Supreme Soviet of the USSR on recommendation from Procurator General. The Procurator General appointed public procurators of the Soviet republics and, on their recommendation, public procurators of autonomous republics, krais, oblasts and autonomous oblasts. He also issued orders and instructions for all of the offices of public procurators, instructed on differentiation of their competence, etc.

The Procurator General had the right to present his issues to the Presidium of the Supreme Soviet that needed to be solved in the legislative manner or demanded interpretation of the law.

The Procurator General's participation in the plenary sessions of the Supreme Court of the USSR was mandatory. He had the right to obtain on demand any case from any court for checking purposes, voice his protest over a law, verdict, decree, or definition, which had already come into force, of any court and to suspend them until the matter was resolved.

Procurators General

See also
 People's Court of the USSR
 Supreme Court of the USSR
 Ministry of Justice of the USSR
 Procurator General of the Russian Federation

Government of the Soviet Union
Soviet law
Politics of the Soviet Union
1922 establishments in the Soviet Union
1991 disestablishments in the Soviet Union